The banded demon (Notocrypta waigensis) is a species of butterfly of the family Hesperiidae. It is found in Indonesia (Irian Jaya, Aru Islands, Kei Islands), New Guinea and Queensland. The larvae feed on various Zingiberaceae species, including Alpinia caerulea and Hornstedtia scottiana. The larvae live in a tube made out of a rolled leaf joined by silk at the edges.

Subspecies
Notocrypta waigensis waigensis
Notocrypta waigensis proserpina

External links
Australian Insects
Australian Faunal Directory

w
Butterflies described in 1882
Butterflies of Asia
Butterflies of Australia